Vexillum beitzi is a species of sea snail, a marine gastropod mollusk, in the family Costellariidae, the ribbed miters.

Description
The length of the shell attains 6 mm.

Distribution
This marine species occurs off the Caroline Islands, Micronesia.

References

External links
 Salisbury, R. A. & Gori, S. (2013). Three tiny new costellarids (Gastropoda: Costellariidae) from the eastern Caroline Islands. Novapex. 14(4): 87-92
 Holotype of Vexillum beitzi

beitzi
Gastropods described in 2013